Michele Samantha Yi Wen Lean ) (born 1 September 1982) known professionally as Michele Lean is a Malaysian television presenter, writer, actress, and commercial talent. From 2007 – 2010 she was a television presenter on China Central Television (CCTV)(中国中央电视台), hosting CCTV-9's Travelogue and Center Stage. She is a Malaysian citizen and Australian permanent resident who currently resides in Beijing, China.

Early life 
Lean is of Malaysian Chinese descent with Tahitiian lineage from the maternal side of her family. She is also of Iban heritage and grew up in Kuala Lumpur, Borneo, Hong Kong and Melbourne. She is the eldest of three children.

Education 
She graduated with a Bachelor of Arts in Media and Communications from the University of Melbourne, before moving to China in 2007.

She trained in acting at the New York Film Academy in New York.

Media career 
While in university, she was the editor-in-chief of the (now defunct) Melbourne-based lifestyle publication Veeza magazine, a subsidiary of Out4Fame Publications.

She has previously interned at the CNN International Asia Pacific office, the Herald Sun online department and The Sun (Malaysia) newspaper in Malaysia.

In Australia, she is represented by China Arts Management in Melbourne.

In July 2007, Lean was recruited by China Central Television's international-language channel CCTV-9, to host their flagship travel program, Travelogue and later hosted CCTV-9's music variety show Center Stage. She also briefly hosted CCTV-9's daily current affairs program Culture Express.

Her debut broadcast for China Central Television's Travelogue was filmed in Xinjiang. She appeared on 3-episodes of the award-winning ethnic minority series, 'Ethnic Odyssey', the first of  Travelogue's programs to be released on DVD in China.

During the Beijing Olympics, she hosted Episode 1 (Central Beijing) and Episode 4 (East Beijing) on Travelogue's Being Beijing series and mini-series, two special programs highlighting the sights, nightlife and culinary delights of Beijing city for Olympic visitors. The series aired throughout the duration of the Beijing Olympics and is also available on DVD throughout China.

In 2011, Lean hosted a special two-episode series in Beijing for CCTV-10's 'Outlook English' program, in Mandarin and English. She was later invited by 'Outlook English' to sit on the guest judging panel of CCTV-10's 'Star of Outlook 2011' competition, an annual nationwide English-speaking contest.

She was selected to host 'Carnival China Style 2011', a major annual Chinese New Year gala, in a month-long tour of the United States with the All-China Federation of Returned Overseas Association. The tour was received in 8 different cities including, Las Vegas, Reno, Modesto, San Francisco and Los Angeles. She continues to co-operate with the All-China Federation of Returned Overseas Association in hopes of linking the cultures of her home countries (Malaysia and Australia) and China's.

Acting 
Lean appears in the director's cut of the 2011 Chinese remake of What Women Want '我知女人心', alongside Andy Lau. The film was directed by Chen Da Ming

She is the lead actress in 'Red Room', winner of the 2011 48 Hour Film Contest's Beijing Audience Award, written and directed by Nelson Quan.

Press
She has appeared in numerous media publications in Australia, Malaysia and China. Notably, in January 2008, where she was interviewed for her style in Vogue China. In 2009 & 2010, she appeared in the luxury and society publication Icon Magazine in Malaysia

Others
She is an avid scuba diver and is a certified PADI Advanced Open Water diver.

Lean is the recipient of The Culinary Trust 2012 -2013 scholarship to Le Cordon Bleu Ottawa.

References

External links
 Alive Not Dead profile
 

1982 births
Living people
People from Kuala Lumpur
Chinese television presenters
Chinese women television presenters
21st-century Chinese women writers
21st-century Chinese writers
Malaysian people of Chinese descent
Malaysian people of French Polynesian descent
21st-century Malaysian women writers
University of Melbourne alumni
New York Film Academy alumni
People educated at Island School